Villa Tesei is a town in Buenos Aires Province, Argentina. It is located in the Greater Buenos Aires agglomeration, in the Hurlingham Partido.

History
Before the foundation of Hurlingham Partido in 1994 Villa Tesei was part of Morón Partido.

External links

Populated places in Buenos Aires Province
Hurlingham Partido